Dick Richards (born 1936) is an American film director, producer and writer.

Dick Richards may also refer to:

 Dick Richards (footballer) (1890–1934), Welsh footballer
 Richard W. Richards (1893–1985), Australian explorer
 James P. Richards (1894–1979), United States Representative from South Carolina, 1933–1957
 Dick Richards (American football) (1907–1996), American football player
 Dick Richards (cricketer) (1908–1995), English cricketer
 Dick Richards (journalist), British showbusiness columnist
 Dick Richards (stage name of Dick Boccelli, 1924–2019), American musician with Bill Haley & His Comets and The Jodimars
 Richard N. Richards (born 1946), American astronaut

See also
 Richard Richards (disambiguation)